was a Japanese Buddhist itinerant preacher (hijiri) who founded the  branch of Pure Land Buddhism.

Life
Ippen was born at Hōgon-ji, a temple in Iyo Province (modern Ehime Prefecture) on the island of Shikoku. He was originally named . He first studied Tendai at Mount Hiei, Kyoto, and then Jōdo-shū at Dazaifu, Fukuoka on Kyushu.

When his father died, the 25-year old Ippen returned to secular life and assumed family responsibilities. He got married and became head of the household.

During a pilgrimage to the Kumano Shrines, the kami enshrined there revealed to Ippen that enlightenment was determined by Amitābha and that Ippen should devote himself to preaching the importance of reciting his name, a practice called nembutsu. Ippen and a band of followers then travelled throughout the country proselytizing with their ecstatic nembutsu dance, and won a wide following among common people.  Other practices associated with the Ji-shū include scheduled sessions of chanting (hence the name Ji-shū "Time sect"), the handing out of slips of paper with the nembutsu written on them, and keeping a register of the converted.

Doctrine 
Ippen's doctrine was primarily influenced by Shōkū, founder of the Seizan branch of the Jōdo-shū, who "insisted that the various Buddhist practices contain no more than a portion of the merit of the single practice of the nembutsu and serve merely to lead people to recite the nembutsu." However he was also strongly influenced by the nondualism of Zen and  even received Dharma transmission as a Zen master from Rōshi Kakushin.

Legacy 
Before his death Ippen burned all his writings, saying that "they have all become namuamidabutsu (devotion to Amida Buddha)", but copies were kept by some of his disciples. Dennis Hirots has translated some of these writings into English in No Abode: The Record of Ippen (1997).<ref>Dennis Hirota, 'No Abode: The Record of Ippen, Ryukoku-Ibs Studies in Buddhist Thought and Tradition, Honolulu: University of Hawai'i Press 1997 </ref>

After Ippen's death many of his disciples appear to have committed suicide, throwing themselves into the sea in the hope of being reborn in the Pure Land.  Such phenomena perhaps help to explain the limited spread of the Ji-shu, and the ecstatic fervor of the early Ji-shu also seems to have militated against mainstream acceptance.

In 1292, three years after Ippen's death, Ippen's birthplace, Hōgon-ji, was rebuilt by his disciple Sen'a and became a Ji sect temple.

 Art 

Ippen himself was greatly devoted to paintings of Shandao's allegory of the "White Path", so it is appropriate that his life led to the production of a great many portraits, sculpted images, and illustrated narrative scrolls (emaki 絵巻).

The Ippen Hijiri-e (一遍聖絵)  was edited by Ippen's disciple Shōkai (聖戒) and, according to an inscription dated 1299, was painted by the artist En'i (円伊) (Kankikō-ji 歓喜光寺, Kyoto, and Tokyo National Museum). The twelve handscrolls on silk show Ippen's trip around Japan, and are well known for their naturalistic depiction of "famous places", including Mount Fuji (富士), Kumano, Shitennō-ji (四天王寺), Zenkō-ji (善光寺), Enoshima (江ノ島), Yoshino (吉野), Itsukushima (厳島), and Naruto (鳴門). The treatment of space shows the influence of Song and Yuan Chinese landscape painting. A second type of biographical handscroll Ippen Shōnin Engi-e 一遍上人縁起絵), edited by Ippen's other disciple, Sōshun (宗俊), was painted sometime between 1304 and 1307. The original scrolls no longer exist but were copied in many other versions including those at Shinkō-ji (真光寺), Hyōgo Prefecture. These versions are characterized by the addition of the biography of Ippen's most important disciple, Taa (他阿, 1237–1319). In the Shinkō-ji version, the first four scrolls depict Ippen's life, while the last six concern the life of Taa and the spread of Ji Sect teaching. The Kinren-ji (金蓮寺) in Kyoto has a Muromachi period copy of the now-lost work dated 1307.

 References 

 Bibliography 
 Foard, James Harlan (1977). Ippen Shônin and popular Buddhism in Kamakura Japan, Dissertation, Stanford University. OCLC
 Foard, James Harlan(2006). The Pure Land Tradition: History and Development, Fremont, CA: Jain Publishing. . pp. 357–398
 Griffiths, Caitilin J. (2011). Tracing the Itinerant Path: Jishū Nuns of Medieval Japan, Thesis, University of Toronto
 Hirota, Dennis (1997). No Abode: The Record of Ippen'',  (Ryukoku-Ibs Studies in Buddhist Thought and Tradition), Honolulu: Univ. of Hawai'i Press, 
 Kaufman, Laura S. (1992). Nature, Courtly Imagery, and Sacred Meaning in the Ippen Hijiri-e. In James H. Sanford (ed.), Flowing Traces Buddhism in the Literary and Visual Arts of Japan, Princeton, N.J.: Princeton University Press; pp. 47–75
 Matsunaga, Daigan, Matsunaga, Alicia (1996), Foundation of Japanese buddhism, Vol. 2: The Mass Movement (Kamakura and Muromachi Periods), Los Angeles; Tokyo: Buddhist Books International, 1996. 
 Thornton, S.A. (1999). Charisma and Community Formation in Medieval Japan: The Case of the Yugyo-ha (1300-1700). Cornell East Asia Series no. 102, Ithaca: Cornell University,

Credits 
Paragraphs 2,3,4,11,12 are all courtesy of the Japanese Architecture and Art Net Users System.

External links

Jodo Shu Research Institute
Stewart, Harold, Ippen
 The Yugyo-ji temple / Head temple of the ji-shu sect
 念佛金言录
 Shonin Ippen, E-den (Biographical stories vol7)
The Ji Sect (時宗)
Ji-Shu Main Temple website

1234 births
1289 deaths
Japanese Buddhist clergy
Pure Land Buddhism
Founders of Buddhist sects
Kamakura period Buddhist clergy